Giga Sar (also Romanized as Gīgā Sar, Gīgāsar) is a village in Rud Pish Rural District, in the Central District of Fuman County, Gilan Province, Iran. At the 2006 census, its population was 909, in 259 families.

References 

Populated places in Fuman County